Jose Valencia is the name of:
Jose F. Valencia, Ecuadorian American College President 
José Daniel Valencia (born 1955), Argentine footballer
José Valencia (footballer, born 1982), Ecuadorian footballer
José Adolfo Valencia (born 1991), Colombian footballer
Jose Hector Valencia, a Mexican pilot the victim of Aeroméxico Flight 498